Paulino Lukudu Obede, (born on 17 September 1990) is a South Sudanese politician. Lukudu was a member of the South Sudan National Dialogue and currently a member of the Transitional National Legislature (Council of States) which is equivalent to senate in other countries. He was appointed among the appointees of the Other Political Parties on  17th September 2021.

He is also the leader of United South Sudan Party (USSP), a registered political party in South Sudan. He replaced Clement Mbugoniwia, who was the Chairperson of the party.

Early life and Education 
Paulino Lukudu Obede was born in Juba County of Central Equatoria State to Mr. Obede Ladu Laila Porun and Reida Juan Bullen Ladu, all from Loka West in Lainya County of Central Equatoria State. He is a first born in a family of seven siblings.

Paulino started his early education in Juba in 1997 from St. Kizito Primary School where he completed Primary Leaving Examinations in 2005. He later joined Juba Day Secondary School and finished Sudan School Certificate in 2009. He later joined University of Juba and graduated with Diploma in Faculty of Economics and Social Studies department of Political Science.

Career 
Mr. Lukudu is the first former Minister of Information for Central Equatoria State in the Revitalized Transitional Government of National Unity.

Paulino Lukudu was appointed Minister of Information and Communication for Central Equatoria State in February 2021 when the state government structures were formed.

He was then suspended indefinitely from his position about three months later by the Governor of Central Equatoria, Emmanuel Adil, with no reason provided.

Paulino Lukudu is also the Youngest Influential Leader of the United South Sudan Party or USSP, a registered political party in the country and a member of the National Alliance Political Parties under OPP.

References 

South Sudanese politicians
Year of birth missing (living people)
Living people